Transmembrane and immunoglobulin domain containing 1 is a protein that in humans is encoded by the TMIGD1 gene. TMIGD1 was discovered by Nader Rahimi.

References